Time in the Palestinian territories is two hours ahead of UTC (UTC+02:00).

During summer, it observes DST, one hour ahead of the standard time (UTC+03:00).

The Palestine Government announces the dates for the start and end of summer time. In 2020, they announced the end of summer time on 19 October, only 5 days before the change.

References 

 
Geography of Palestine (region)